The Panzerkanone 68 ("Armoured gun 68") is a Swiss self-propelled howitzer produced by the Eidgenoessische Konstruktionswerkstaette (Federal Manufacturing Works) to meet a Swiss Army requirement. Only four were manufactured; they served for three years with the Swiss military before being retired.

History and development
The manufacture of a self-propelled howitzer was being considered in Switzerland in the mid-1950s. Studies were developed by the Group on Arms Services (GRD) and Eidgenoessische Konstruktionswerkstaette . Real development began in 1966 with the mounting of a 15 cm howitzer on a Panzer 61 chassis. Subsequently, four vehicles were built on Panzer 68 chassis.

Due to technical and financial problems, the project was never pursued. The Swiss Army procured the American M109 howitzer instead. The four vehicles were used experimentally from 1972 to 1975. Two vehicles are preserved; one at the Panzermuseum Thun, the other one at the Schweizerische Militärmuseum Full.

References 

 Heller, Urs: Die Panzer der Schweizer Armee von 1920 bis 2008
 Schweizerische Militärmuseum Full

External links 
  Panzerkanone 68  on militaerfahrzeuge.ch (German)

Abandoned military projects of Switzerland